Čeplje is a village in the Municipality of Vransko in central Slovenia. It lies on the edge of the Savinja Valley east of Vransko. The Slovenian A1 motorway crosses northwest of the village core with the number 19 Vransko exit built entirely within the settlement's territory.  The area is part of the traditional region of Styria. The municipality is now included in the Savinja Statistical Region.

References

External links

Čeplje at Geopedia

Populated places in the Municipality of Vransko